Chrissy & Mr. Jones is an American reality television series featuring Chrissy Lampkin and Jim Jones. It premiered on September 24, 2012, on VH1 as a spin-off of Love & Hip Hop: New York. The second season premiered on October 28, 2013. The show did not return for a third season.

Three years after the show's finale, Lampkin and Jones returned in a six-part series, Jim & Chrissy: Vow or Never, which premiered September 1, 2016 on WE tv.

Development
On September 7, 2012, VH1 confirmed that Chrissy and Jim would leave Love & Hip Hop, to star in their own spin-off show, now titled Chrissy & Mr. Jones.

Series synopsis

Overview and casting
Chrissy & Mr. Jones chronicles Chrissy and Jim's romantic struggles, as well as their business ventures, specifically Jim's Vamp Life clothing brand.

Several members of Chrissy and Jim's inner circle appear as supporting cast members in green screen confessional interview segments throughout the series. They include Chrissy's best friend and former Love & Hip Hop co-star Emily Bustamante, Jim's mother Nancy Jones, Nancy's long-time friend and occasional business partner Freddie Robinson Jr. and celebrity stylist Talia Coles. Chrissy and Jim's housekeeper Paulina and Jim's personal assistant Tina Lauren would appear in minor supporting roles, while Rev. Run, Adrienne Bailon, Talia's boyfriend CJ Hilton, Russell Simmons and Rev.'s wife Justine Simmons would make guest appearances.

The show returned for a second season with Jim's son Joseph "Pudie" Jones II joining the cast, along with Nancy's friend and partner-in crime LaToya "Sassy" Everett and Waka Flocka Flame's mother and business manager Deb Antney, who acts as Chrissy's mentor for her business ventures. Freekey Zekey, photographer Heather Hunter, Damon Dash, author Wahida Clark and Ice-T would make guest appearances.

Cast timeline

Episodes

Series overview

Season 1 (2012)

Season 2 (2013)

Jim & Chrissy: Vow or Never

Jim & Chrissy: Vow or Never is a reality series that aired from September 1, 2016 until October 6, 2016 on WE tv. It chronicled the lives of Jim and Chrissy in Miami, Florida. It is not made by the same production company as Chrissy & Mr. Jones and is not considered a part of the Love & Hip Hop franchise.

Jim's mother Nancy returned as a supporting cast member, along with new cast mates Tiffany Barnes and Freekey Zekey.

Season 1 (2016)

References

External links
 
 

Love & Hip Hop
2010s American reality television series
2012 American television series debuts
American television spin-offs
African-American reality television series
English-language television shows
Television shows set in New York City
Reality television spin-offs
VH1 original programming
2013 American television series endings